Mendoza, officially the City of Mendoza is the capital of the province of Mendoza in Argentina. It is located in the northern-central part of the province, in a region of foothills and high plains, on the eastern side of the Andes.

Ruta Nacional 7, the major road running between Buenos Aires and Santiago, runs through Mendoza. The city is a frequent stopover for climbers on their way to Aconcagua (the highest mountain in the Western and Southern Hemispheres) and for adventure travelers interested in mountaineering, hiking, horse riding, rafting, and other sports. In the winter, skiers come to the city for easy access to the Andes.

Two of the main industries of the Mendoza area are olive oil production and Argentine wine. The region around Greater Mendoza is the largest wine-producing area in South America. As such, Mendoza is one of the eleven Great Wine Capitals, and the city is an emerging enotourism destination and base for exploring the region's hundreds of wineries located along the Argentina Wine Route.

History 

On March 2, 1561, Pedro del Castillo founded the city and named it Ciudad de Mendoza del Nuevo Valle de La Rioja after the governor of Chile, Don García Hurtado de Mendoza.  Before the 1560s the area was populated by tribes known as the Huarpes and Puelches. The Huarpes devised a system of irrigation that was later developed by the Spanish. This allowed for an increase in population that might not have otherwise occurred. The system is still evident today in the wide trenches (acequias), which run along all city streets, watering the approximately 100,000 trees that line every street in Mendoza.

It is estimated that fewer than 80 Spanish settlers lived in the area before 1600, but later prosperity increased due to the use of indigenous and slave labor, and the Jesuit presence in the region. When nearby rivers were tapped as a source of irrigation in 1788 agricultural production increased. The extra revenues generated from this, and the ensuing additional trade with Buenos Aires, Viceroyalty on which it depended since its creation and transfer from the Captaincy General of Chile in 1776, no doubt led to the creation of the state of Cuyo in 1813 with José de San Martín as governor. It was from Mendoza that San Martín and other Argentinian and Chilean patriots organized the army with which they won the independence of Chile and Peru.
Mendoza suffered a severe earthquake in 1861 that killed at least 4,247 people (36.9%). The city was rebuilt, incorporating innovative urban designs that would better tolerate such seismic activity. Mendoza was rebuilt with large squares and wider streets and sidewalks than any other city in Argentina. Avenue Bartolomé Mitre and additional small squares are examples of that design.

Tourism, wine production, and more recently the exploitation of commodities such as oil and uranium ensure Mendoza's status as a key regional centre. Important suburbs such as Godoy Cruz, Guaymallén, Las Heras and Luján de Cuyo have in recent decades far outpaced the city proper in population. Comprising half the metro population of 212,000 in 1947, these suburbs grew to nearly ⅞ of the total metro area of over 1,000,000 by 2015, making Mendoza the most dispersed metro area in Argentina.

Culture
Mendoza has several museums, including the Museo Cornelio Moyano, a natural history museum, and the Museo del Área Fundacional (Historical Regional Foundation Museum) on Pedro del Castillo Square. The mansion is home to many of the artist's paintings.

The Fiesta Nacional de la Vendimia (The National Grape Harvest Festival) occurs in early March each year. Part of the festivities include a beauty pageant, where 17 beauty queens from each department of Mendoza Province compete, and one winner is selected by a panel of about 50 judges. The queen of Mendoza city's department does not compete and acts as host for the other queens.

In 2008, National Geographic listed Mendoza as one of the top 10 historic destinations in the world.

Urban structure 
The city is centred around Plaza Independencia (Independence Plaza) with Avenida Sarmiento running through its centre east–west, with the east side pedestrianized (peatonal). Other major streets, running perpendicular to Sarmiento, include Bartolomé Mitre, San Martín, and 9 de Julio (July 9th), those running parallel include Colón, and Las Heras. Four smaller plazas, San Martín, Chile, Italia, and España, are located 2 blocks off each corner of Independence Plaza. Unique to Mendoza are the exposed stone ditches, essentially small canals, which run alongside many of the roads supplying water to the thousands of trees.

Parque General San Martín (General San Martín Park) was designed by Carlos Thays. Its grounds include the Mendoza Zoological Park and a football stadium, and it is also the home of the Universidad Nacional de Cuyo. A view of the city is available from the top of Cerro de la Gloria (Mt. Glory).

One common point of interest is the Teatro Independencia ("Independence Theatre"), the premier performing arts venue in Mendoza. Supervised by the nation's Ministry of Public Works, the project was commissioned to architect Alfredo Israel, and its plans were approved in October 1923. The theatre was, as were many public works of this type in Argentina at the time, designed in a French Academy style. Its façade included a Neoclassical frontis featuring four Corinthian columns on a green marble base, a rococo frieze, the provincial escutcheon in bas-relief, and a balustrade above. The design for the interiors was based on those prevailing in Italian opera houses, and the formal vestibule is overlooked by grand marble steps leading to the concert hall. The auditorium itself includes four tiers of balconies, and its seating capacity is 730. The theatre serves as the home of the Provincial Philharmonic Orchestra. In addition, the theatre has received international personalities such as Erlend Øye and John Malkovich.

Education
Mendoza has a number of universities, including the major Universidad Nacional de Cuyo, as well as University of Mendoza, a branch of Universidad Congreso, Aconcagua University, UTN (Universidad Tecnologica Nacional) and Champagnat University.

Mendoza is a popular place to learn Spanish, and there are a number of Spanish language schools, including Intercultural, Green Fields and SIMA.

Transportation

Gov. Francisco Gabrielli International Airport serves Mendoza, with flights to/from Buenos Aires taking less than 2 hours and less than 1 hour to/from Santiago.

The public transport system includes buses, the Mendoza trolleybus system, and taxis. The trolleybuses are more comfortable than the diesel buses, but are slower, not as numerous nor is the system as extensive. In 2008, TransLink of Vancouver, British Columbia, Canada, sold most of its old trolleybus fleet to Mendoza.

A heritage railway, El Tren del Vino (The Wine Train), is being planned which will also provide local transportation; it will run through wine-producing districts of Mendoza.

Metrotranvía 
A  light rail line, the Metrotranvía Mendoza, opened for regular service in October 2012. It serves the areas of Las Heras, Godoy Cruz and Maipú in the Greater Mendoza conurbation, as well as the central area of Mendoza itself. The line runs from Avellaneda station in the Panquehua neighborhood of Las Heras to Gutiérrez in Maipú, stopping also at the Mendoza Railway Station at the site of the former intercity passenger train station, near the city centre. The bright red railcars, Siemens-Duewag U2s, were purchased from the San Diego Metropolitan Transit System (MTS) in 2010. They were built in 1980.

Transandine Railway 
Mendoza's development was helped partly due to its position at the start of the Transandine Railway linking it to Santa Rosa de Los Andes in Chile. The only railway operable between Argentina and Chile, after many years of inactivity, it remains currently abandoned.

The railway is a  line, with sections of Abt rack, whilst the railways it links with are both  broad gauge. A journey from Buenos Aires to Chile involved two breaks-of-gauge, and therefore two changes of train, one at Mendoza, and the other at Santa Rosa de Los Andes.

Wine industry

Argentina's Malbec wines originate from Mendoza's high-altitude wine regions of Lujan de Cuyo and the Uco Valley. These districts are located in the foothills of the Andes mountains between 2,800 and 5,000 feet elevation.
Vintner Nicolas Catena Zapata is considered the pioneer of high-altitude growing and was the first, in 1994, to plant a malbec vineyard at 5,000 feet above sea level in the Mendoza region. His family is also credited with making world-class wines and giving status to the wines of Argentina.

The subject of elevation is of much interest to the wine world because with increased altitude, the intensity of the sunlight increases. The role of this increased light intensity is currently being investigated by Catena Zapata's research and development department headed up by Laura Catena, Alejandro Vigil and Fernando Buscema.

In film
Seven Years in Tibet, directed by French director Jean-Jacques Annaud and starring Brad Pitt, was shot in and around Mendoza.

In video games 
Mendoza appears as the penultimate level in the video game Hitman 3. It contains hints of Argentine culture, such as mate, tango, and wine production.

Climate

Mendoza's climate is characterised as an arid (Köppen climate classification BWk); with continental characteristics. Most precipitation in Mendoza falls in the summer months (November–March). Summers are hot and humid where mean temperatures exceed . Winters are cold and dry with mean temperatures below . Night time temperatures can occasionally fall below freezing during the winter. Because winters are dry with little precipitation, snowfall is uncommon, occurring once per year. Mendoza's annual rainfall is only , so extensive farming is made possible by irrigation from major rivers.

Sports

See 

In 1978 Mendoza hosted six matches of the 1978 FIFA World Cup. The six were played at the Malvinas Argentinas Stadium.

The city boasts at least two significant football clubs—Independiente Rivadavia and Gimnasia y Esgrima de Mendoza, although neither currently plays in the Primera División. A club from the nearby city of Godoy Cruz, Godoy Cruz Antonio Tomba, is currently in the 1st division.

International rugby test matches featuring the Argentina national rugby team have also been held in Mendoza.

People

See

International relations

Mendoza is twinned with:
 Tarija, Bolivia
 São Paulo, Brazil
 Nashville, US

See also 

 1985 Mendoza earthquake
 2006 Mendoza earthquake

References

Sources 
 V. Letelier (1907). Apuntes sobre el terremoto de Mendoza. Santiago
 V. Blasco Ibánez (1910). Argentina y sus Grandezas. Madrid

External links 

  
 Audio slideshow: Mendoza City, Argentina- An earthquake hotspot. Travel writer Christabelle Dilks discusses how earthquakes have shaped the city of Mendoza. Royal Geographical Society's Hidden Journeys project
 Universidad Nacional de Cuyo
 Tourism office
 
 

 
Populated places in Mendoza Province
Capitals of Argentine provinces
Populated places established in 1561
1561 establishments in the Spanish Empire
1561 establishments in South America
Cities in Argentina
Argentina
Mendoza Province